Opinion polling for the 2011 Croatian parliamentary election started early after the previous election with polls on individual parties. As electoral coalitions were formed, coalition ratings started to be polled as well. The poll results below are listed by category and ordered in reverse chronological order. Major political events are indicated chronologically between individual polls. Concurrent polling was at the time also done for the 2012 Croatian European Union membership referendum.

Exit polls

Seat projections
The three main national television stations contracted Ipsos Puls to conduct exit polling at 403 stations.

Campaign poll results

Overall party rating

Generic national polls are conducted to indicate overall party rating and provide a trend indicator, while the actual election is conducted not with a single electoral unit but with the Croatian Parliament electoral districts.

The listed poll dates are either the dates when the poll was conducted, or alternatively the date when the poll result was published.

Seat projections
Because the seats in the Parliament are split according to Croatian Parliament electoral districts, seat projections significantly vary from a generic overall poll.

The seat projections do not include:
 the 8 seats from minority voters, and these representatives are not usually strictly aligned with mainstream parties
 the 3 seats from voters residing abroad, which have in every election since independence gone to HDZ
The new composition of Parliament will have 151 seats meaning that 76 seats will be needed for a majority.

Because of the nature of the D'Hondt method and the division into constituencies, seat projections are less reliable, so some polls list tentative options, indicated in parenthesis.

The listed poll dates are either the dates when the poll was conducted, or alternatively the date when the poll result was published.

Early polling

Overall party rating

Generic national polls are conducted to indicate overall party rating and provide a trend indicator, while the actual election is conducted not with a single electoral unit but with the Croatian Parliament electoral districts.

The listed poll dates are either the dates when the poll was conducted, or alternatively the date when the poll result was published.

2011

2010

2009

2008

2007 

* – HSS and HSLS contested the election together, with HSS being the senior partner. HSU contested the election with another smaller party.

Seat projections
The seat projections do not include:
 the 8 seats from minority voters, and these representatives are not usually strictly aligned with mainstream parties
 the 3 seats from voters residing abroad, which have in every election since independence gone to HDZ
The new composition of Parliament will have 151 seats meaning that 76 seats will be needed for a majority.

The listed poll dates are either the dates when the poll was conducted, or alternatively the date when the poll result was published.

Coalition rating

Party rating
The listed poll dates are either the dates when the poll was conducted, or alternatively the date when the poll result was published.

References

Croatia
Opinion polling in Croatia